Levi Heimans (born 24 July 1985 in Diemen, North Holland) is a Dutch track cyclist.

Heimans represented the Netherlands at the 2004 Summer Olympics in Athens where he took part in the 4 km team pursuit together with Jens Mouris, Peter Schep and Jeroen Straathof. They ended up in fifth position. He was also qualified for the individual pursuit but decided to focus totally on the team effort and did not start in that race.  He competed in the same event at the 2008 and 2012 Summer Olympics, finishing 5th again and then 7th.

Palmarès

2008
3rd 2008 Dutch National Track Championships, Individual pursuit
2009
1st 2009 Dutch National Track Championships, Individual pursuit
2010
3rd 2010 European Track Championships, Team pursuit
1st 2010 Dutch National Track Championships, Individual pursuit
2011
2nd 2011 Dutch National Track Championships, Individual pursuit

See also
 List of Dutch Olympic cyclists

References

External links
Homepage Levi Heimans
Heimans at the Dutch Olympic Archive

1985 births
Living people
People from Diemen
Cyclists at the 2004 Summer Olympics
Cyclists at the 2008 Summer Olympics
Cyclists at the 2012 Summer Olympics
Olympic cyclists of the Netherlands
Dutch male cyclists
Dutch cyclists at the UCI Track Cycling World Championships
Cyclists from North Holland
20th-century Dutch people
21st-century Dutch people